Malmö FF competed in Superettan and Svenska Cupen for the 2000 season. The club was promoted to Allsvenskan.

Players

Squad stats

|}

Competitions

Superettan

League table

Matches

Club

Kit

|
|

Other information

References
 

Malmö FF seasons
Malmo FF